César Ojinaga (31 March 1926 – 20 April 1999) was a Spanish actor known for his roles in western films directed by Joan Bosch. He starred in Una tumba para Johnny Ringo (1967), La legión del silencio, Companys, proceso a Cataluña (1979), Delincuentes (1956), Los gamberros (1954), and Nunca es demasiado tarde (1955), Dallas (1974), Chico, chica, ¡boom! (1968), and La diligencia de los condenados (1970). Ojinaga died in Barcelona on 20 April 1999, at the age of 73.

Filmography

TV series

References

Bibliography

External links

 

1926 births
1999 deaths
20th-century Spanish male actors
Male actors from Madrid
Spanish male film actors
Spanish male television actors